William Black (22 March 1869 – 3 May 1930) was a Progressive party member of the House of Commons of Canada. He was born in McKillop Township, Ontario and became a farmer.

He was elected to Parliament at the Huron South riding in the 1921 general election. After completing his only term, the 14th Canadian Parliament, Black left federal politics and did not seek another term in the 1925 election.

External links
 

1869 births
1930 deaths
Canadian farmers
Members of the House of Commons of Canada from Ontario
People from Huron County, Ontario
Progressive Party of Canada MPs